George Joseph Gustave Masson (9 March 1819 – 29 August 1888), was an English-born educational writer with a French father and an English mother.

Life
He was born in London on 9 March 1819. 
His father had served under Napoleon I, and survived the retreat from Moscow ; his mother was of English origin. 
Gustave was educated at Tours, was exempted from military service as eldest son of a widow, and was awarded the diploma of 'Bachelier es Lettres' by the University of France on 8 August 1837. 
After some ten years of literary struggle in Paris, he came to England as tutor to the two sons of Captain Trotter of the Woodlands, Harrow, and was in 1855 appointed by Dr. Vaughan, headmaster of Harrow School, French master there. 
He proved himself a good organiser, and took a prominent part in the life of the school. He was from 1869 Vaughan librarian and published a catalogue.
 
Masson was an author and translator on a large scale, writing many books on French literature and history, and editing with much success numerous French classics for English students. 
He was at the same time a frequent contributor to the Athenæum, and supplied the notes on French literature to the Saturday Review from soon after its foundation until 1880. 
He gave up his Harrow mastership in the autumn of 1888, and died a few weeks later on 29 August at Ewhurst, Surrey, while on a visit to Sir Henry Doulton ; he was buried in Harrow churchyard.

Family
By his wife, whose maiden name was Janet Clarke, and whom he married in 1843, he left two sons and two daughters.

Works
His works were:
Introduction to the History of French Literature (1860)
 La lyre Française (an anthology in the Golden Treasury series (1867)
 A Compendious Dictionary of the French Language (1874)
 Outlines of French Literature (1877)
 Early Chronicles of Europe: France (1879)
 The Huguenots: a Sketch of their History (1881)
 French Literature (1888)
 Medieval France from Hugues Capet to the Sixteenth Century (1888)

References

Attribution

External links

 

1819 births
1888 deaths
English writers
Education writers